is Sachi Tainaka's third single and was released on August 30, 2006. The title track was used as the ending theme for the Japanese animation Saiunkoku Monogatari.

The single reached #50 in Japan. The CD's catalog number is GNCX-0005.

Track listing
1. 最高の片想い
Lyrics: Sachi Tainaka
Music: Sachi Tainaka

2. It's my life
Lyrics: Sachi Tainaka
Music: Sachi Tainaka

3. 最高の片想い -instrumental-

4. It's my life -instrumental-

References

2006 singles
Sachi Tainaka songs